William Keolaloa Kahānui Sumner, Jr. (c. 1816 – May 25, 1885) was a high chief of the Kingdom of Hawaii through his mother's family; his father was an English captain from Northampton. Sumner married a Tahitian princess. Aided by royal family connections, he became a major landowner and politician in Hawaii.

After contracting leprosy in 1877, by law Sumner was exiled to Kalaupapa, Molokaʻi. He served there as luna (superintendent) of the leper colony from 1878 to 1884. He died of leprosy in a Honolulu hospital in 1884.

Early life and family 
William Keolaloa Kahānui Sumner, Jr. was born circa 1816, the eldest son of Captain William Sumner (1786–1847) and High Chiefess Keakua'aihue Kanealai Hua. Captain Sumner, from Northampton, was an early settler of Hawaii who arrived in 1807 as a cabin boy. Befriended by Kauai's king Kaumualii, Sumner later became a naval captain under King Kamehameha I, who united the Hawaiian Islands in 1810. Related to the Kamehamehas through Uminuikukaailani, his mother family descended from the famous twins Kahānui and Kaha‘opulani, the Kohala chiefs who reared Kamehameha during his infancy. His mother was also a cousin and hānai (adoptive) sister of High Chiefess Ahia Beckley, wife of Captain George Charles Beckley, who was one of the reputed designers of the Flag of Hawaii.
William had younger siblings: John Kapilikea Sumner (1820–1915) and Maria Sumner (1824–1908). Maria married Henry Sea and later Robert Grimes Davis.

Both Sumner brothers married Tahitian princesses. William married Manaiula Tehuiarii. John married her cousin Princess Ninito, who had been formally betrothed to Prince Moses Kekūāiwa.  With Manaiula Tehuiarii, he had his eldest daughter Nancy Wahinekapu Sumner (1839–1895). After Manailua's death, William married Mauli Tehuiarii; their daughter was Elizabeth Keawepoʻoʻole Sumner (1850–1911). Both Nancy and Elizabeth Sumner served as ladies-in-waiting at the Hawaiian royal court. Through both daughters, Sumner has living descendants.

Career 
Sumner and his brother John bought the land of Mōkapu from High Chief Abner Pākī in 1856. This land passed to his brother after William's death, and then to their sister Maria and her children from her second marriage with Robert Grimes Davis. The former Sumner landholdings in Mōkapu, along with other parcels held by other Hawaiian landholders in the region, were later acquired by the United States government and developed as the Marine Corps Base Hawaii.

Sumner was elected to the House of Representative for Oahu with a seat for the regular session of the Legislature of 1855 but, according to American Commissioner to Hawaii David Lawrence Gregg, he did not appear to serve for an unknown reason. The legislative roster for 1855 listed his name as "William Sumner Keolaloa." The records of the House of Representatives however indicate that a "W. S. Keolaloa" participated in the legislative sessions. Either way, Sumner was defeated for reelection in the summer of 1855.
On January 16, 1864, he was commissioned first lieutenant of the 1st Company of the Yeomanry, a volunteer army regiment in the military of Hawaii.

Superintendent of Kalaupapa 
After Sumner contracted leprosy (also known as Hansen's disease), he was admitted to the leper colony of Kalaupapa on March 24, 1877. The legislature of the kingdom in 1865 had enacted a law for the prevention of leprosy, which required those with severe cases to be quarantined at the colony on Molokaʻi. Later that same year, the first luna (superintendent) William P. Ragsdale died; he was a highly popular part-Hawaiian attorney who had also served the government as an interpreter. After Ragsdale died, the Board of Health temporarily appointed the Catholic priest Father Damien as his replacement, but Damien proved unpopular with the native Hawaiian residents. He demonstrated religious discrimination, harshly treating a Hawaiian Protestant minister J. K. Kahuila, whom he judged as too independent. The native population petitioned for Damien's removal, and for Sumner, who was much more well-liked and amicable, to take over. Father Damien resigned shortly afterward and Sumner was appointed the luna by the government in Honolulu.

From 1878 to 1884, Sumner served as luna of the Kalaupapa, representing the Board of Health. He was tasked with "keeping order" in the settlement, with the American Clayton Strawn serving as his assistant. Sumner was bilingual in Hawaiian and English, and was also well liked and respected by the residents. However, he was considered too old and ill to maintain the position of leadership for long. In 1879, Nathaniel Bright Emerson became the resident physician and took over many of Sumner's responsibilities. Sumner was allowed to retain the title of luna to avoid opposition from a majority of the residents if he was removed.

In 1884, Sumner was sent for treatment to Kakaʻako Branch Hospital in Honolulu. He was replaced by Ambrose Kanoeali‘i Hutchison, another part-Hawaiian man, as resident superintendent. Sumner died in Honolulu on May 25, 1885. He was buried at the King Street Catholic Cemetery , also known as the Honolulu Catholic Cemetery, beside other members of the Sumner family.

References

Bibliography

Further reading 

1810s births
1885 deaths
Hawaiian Kingdom people
Hawaiian nobility
Hawaiian Kingdom people of English descent
Members of the Hawaiian Kingdom House of Representatives
People from Molokai
Deaths from leprosy
Superintendents of Kalaupapa
Hawaiian Kingdom military officers
Hawaiian Kingdom Roman Catholics
Burials at Honolulu Catholic Cemetery
Nobility of the Americas